Tibor Tatai (born August 4, 1944) is a Hungarian sprint canoeist who competed in the late 1960s and early 1970s. He won the gold medal in the C-1 1000 m event at the 1968 Summer Olympics in Mexico City.

Tatai also won two medals at the ICF Canoe Sprint World Championships in the C-1 1000 m event with a gold in 1970 and a silver in 1971.

References

Sports-reference.com profile

1944 births
Canoeists at the 1968 Summer Olympics
Hungarian male canoeists
Living people
Olympic canoeists of Hungary
Olympic gold medalists for Hungary
Olympic medalists in canoeing
ICF Canoe Sprint World Championships medalists in Canadian

Medalists at the 1968 Summer Olympics
20th-century Hungarian people